Saba’ (from the city called "Sheba") is the 34th chapter (sūrah) of the Qur'an with 54 verses (āyāt). It discusses the lives of Solomon and David, a story about the people of Sheba, challenges and warnings against the disbelievers as well as the promises related to the Day of Judgment.

Regarding the timing and contextual background of the believed revelation (asbāb al-nuzūl), it is an earlier "Meccan surah", which means it has been revealed in Mecca, instead of later in Medina.

Summary

The chapter begins with the phrase Alhamdulillah ("Praise be to God"), one of five chapters to do so; the others are Al Fātiḥah, Al-An'am, Al-Kahf and Fatir. The first two verses assert God's praiseworthiness and omnipotence. The following verses (3–9) criticized the disbelievers for their rejection of the resurrection, the Day of Judgement and of Muhammad's message. The ninth verse also mentions the orderliness of the universe as evidence of God's omnipotence. The following verses (10–14) briefly discuss David and Solomon, both of whom are among the prophets in Islam.

Verses 15–19 contain a story about the eponymous people of Sheba. The story is based on the ancient Sabaeans who lived in the central lowlands of Yemen. According to the verses, they were originally prosperous, but turned away from worship and giving thanks to God, and as a result suffered a flood. The story is presented as a warning against worldly pride and arrogance. Semitic philologist A. F. L. Beeston linked the story to the prosperous Sabeans of the Ma'rib oasis who settled on each side of the wadi (hence the reference to "the garden of the right" and "of the left" in verse 15. Beeston, CNRS researcher Jérémie Schiettecatte, as well as the Quranic commentary The Study Quran argued that the flood corresponds to the failure of the dam system that irrigated the community. The dams were mentioned in inscriptions dated from around 450–540 CE, and The Study Quran further argues that the phrase "the flood of 'Arim" correspond to the triliteral root ʿ-r-m that appeared in the inscriptions to refer to the dam system.

The rest of the chapter discusses various topics, including the nature of Iblis (the Devil in the Islamic tradition), challenges to those who reject the message of Islam, warnings of the consequences which will come to them in the Day of Judgement, as well as the nature of Muhammad's mission.

Ayat (verses)
1-2 Praise to the All-wise and Sovereign God
3 Unbelievers shall not escape the judgment-day 
4-5 The reward of believers and the punishment of infidels sure
6 Certain Jews accept the Quran as the word of God
7 The Quraish scoff at the doctrine of the resurrection
8 Muhammad accused of being a forger of the Quran and a madman
8-9 Divine judgments threatened against the unbelievers
10-11 David received blessing and knowledge from God
12 Solomon received dominion over the winds and the genii
13 The palaces, statues of Solomon etc constructed by genii
14 Solomon’s death concealed from the genii
15-16 The people of Sabá rebel against God and are punished
19 They are dispersed on account of covetousness
20 All but a few believers follow Iblís
21 The idolaters worship imaginary deities
22 Only those who are permitted shall intercede on the judgment-day
23-26 The bountiful God will judge between true believers and the infidels
27 Muhammad sent to man as a warning
28-29 The infidels will feel God’s threatened punishment in the judgment-day 	
30-32 Mutual enmity of the idolaters and their leaders on the day of judgment 	
33 God’s prophets have always been opposed by the affluent
34-35 The Makkans boast in their riches in vain
36 The righteous only shall be saved
37 Muhammad’s adversaries shall be punished
38 The Lord will reward the almsgivers
39-40 The angels shall repudiate their worshippers
41 Idolaters shall be unable to help one another in the judgment
42 The unbelievers call Muhammad a forger of the Quran and blasphemer
43-44 Rejecting their Prophet as did those before them, the Makkans shall receive like punishment
45-49 Muhammad protests the truth of his claims
50-54 Unbelievers shall repent when too late to avail

Revelation history 
The chapter was revealed during the Meccan period of Muhammad's prophethood, therefore, a Meccan sura. Some commentators of the Quran, including Ahmad ibn Ajiba, Mahmud al-Alusi, Ibn al-Jawzi, and Al-Qurtubi opined that the sixth verse was an exception and was revealed in the Medinan period.

Name 
The name of the chapter refers to Sheba, a kingdom mentioned in the Quran and the Bible. Sheba is the subject of verses 15 to 21 of the chapter, although this passage likely does not refer to the kingdom under the famous Queen of Sheba, but rather about a group of people in the same region in a later period. Orientalist A. F. L. Beeston and Jérémie Schiettecatte identified the people in these verses to be the Sabaeans who lived in the Ma'rib valley.

References

Citations

Bibliography

External links
Quran 34 Clear Quran translation
Q34:20, 50+ translations, islamawakened.com

Saba
Sheba